Eduard Pütsep (21 October 1898 – 22 August 1960) was an Estonian wrestler. He competed in Greco-Roman wrestling in the 1920, 1924 and 1928 Olympics and won a gold medal in the bantamweight division in 1924, becoming the first Olympic champion in wrestling from Estonia. In 1928 he placed sixth in Greco-Roman and ninth in freestyle wrestling.

Career
Eduard Pütsep was born in Vastseliina Parish (present-day Võru Parish). He took up wrestling during World War I and in 1917 placed third at the Russian championships. At his first international competition, the 1920 Olympics, he lost in a semifinal to the eventual silver medalist Heikki Kähkönen. Next year he finished fourth at the world championships, and in 1922 won a silver medal. He retired from competitions in 1933 and attended the 1936 Summer Olympics as the head coach of the Latvian wrestling team. During World War II he moved to Finland and continued to coach wrestlers there. Since 1977 an annual international wrestling tournament in his honor has been held in Võru, Estonia.

Pütsep could communicate in eight languages. Yet during his wrestling years he acted in silent films, and was nicknamed "Estonian Chaplin". In 1924, he starred in Õnnelik korterikriisi lahendus, directed by Konstantin Märska, and in 1925 played in Tšeka komissar Miroštšenko.

References

External links

 
 
 
 
 

1898 births
1960 deaths
People from Võru Parish
People from Kreis Werro
Wrestlers at the 1920 Summer Olympics
Wrestlers at the 1924 Summer Olympics
Wrestlers at the 1928 Summer Olympics
Estonian male sport wrestlers
Olympic wrestlers of Estonia
Olympic gold medalists for Estonia
Olympic medalists in wrestling
Medalists at the 1924 Summer Olympics
Estonian male film actors
Estonian male silent film actors
20th-century Estonian male actors
World Wrestling Championships medalists
European Wrestling Championships medalists
Estonian World War II refugees
Estonian emigrants to Finland